Shyam Sundar is a 1940 Indian, Tamil film produced by Lakshmi Cinetone and directed by A. P. Kapoor.

Cast 

Male
Master Raju
C. L. Krishnan
S. Nath
R. Seshan
Thirumoorthi Achary
Janakiram
Kalyanasundaram
Gopala Iyer

Female
K. Thavamani Devi
Kalyani Ammal
Rukmini Devi
K. K. Bai
M. S. Vijayal
Kokila Devi

Production 
The film was produced by Lakshmi Cinetone, Chennai at Hans Pictures Studios in Kolapur and was directed by A. P. Kapoor. N. Venugopal and B. D. Patel were in charge of production. Dialogues and lyrics were written by P. Hanumantha Rao. The film had an alternate title - Radhaiyin Kadhal.

The film was produced in Telugu with the title RadhaKrishnan.

Soundtrack 
The music for the lyrics was composed by H. R. Padmanaba Sastry while the background music was scored by Dada Sandekar. Lyrics were penned by P. Hanumantha Rao. Most of the songs were sung by K. Thavamani Devi set to Carnatic music tunes.

References

External links 
 — A song sung by K. Thavamani Devi in the film